Lyall Berry (9 April 1893 – 20 April 1970) was an Australian cricketer. He played three first-class matches for New South Wales between 1918/19 and 1919/20.

See also
 List of New South Wales representative cricketers

References

External links
 

1893 births
1970 deaths
Australian cricketers
New South Wales cricketers
Cricketers from Sydney